This is a list of political science journals presenting representative academic journals in the field of political science.

A 
Acta Politica
African Affairs
American Journal of Political Science
American Political Science Review
American Politics Research
 The Annals of the American Academy of Political and Social Science
Annual Review of Political Science
Armed Forces & Society
Australian Journal of Political Science
Australian Journal of Politics and History
Australian Quarterly

B 
British Journal of Political Science
British Journal of Politics and International Relations

C
Canadian Journal of Political Science
Caucasian Review of International Affairs
Central European Journal of International and Security Studies
Comparative European Politics
Comparative Political Studies
Conflict Management and Peace Science
Constellations
Contemporary Political Theory
Cooperation and Conflict
Critical Review (journal)

D 
Debatte: Journal of Contemporary Central and Eastern Europe

E 
East European Politics
Electoral Studies
Environmental Politics (journal)
European Journal of International Relations
European Journal of Political Economy
European Journal of Political Research
European Journal of Political Theory
European Political Science
European Political Science Review
European Union Politics

F 

Foreign Affairs
Foreign Policy
Foreign Policy Analysis

G 
Global Environmental Politics
Global Governance
Global Policy
Government and Opposition
Governance

H 
History of Political Thought (journal)

I 
Icelandic Review of Politics and Administration
Independent Review
International Affairs
International Journal of Conflict and Violence
International Journal of Press/Politics
International Journal of Transitional Justice
International Organization
International Political Science Review
International Security
International Studies Quarterly
International Studies Review
International Theory

J 
Journal for Peace and Justice Studies
Journal of Common Market Studies
Journal of Conflict Resolution
Journal of Contingencies and Crisis Management
Journal of Democracy
Journal of European Integration
Journal of European Public Policy
Journal of Information Technology & Politics
Journal of Law and Economics
The Journal of Legislative Studies
Journal of Moral Philosophy
Journal of Peace Research
Journal of Political Economy
Journal of Political Ideologies
Journal of Political Philosophy
Journal of Politics
Journal of Politics & Society
Journal of Theoretical Politics
Journal of Women, Politics & Policy

L 
Legislative Studies Quarterly

M 
Mediterranean Politics
Moral Philosophy and Politics

N 
Nations and Nationalism
New Left Review
New Political Economy

P 
Parliamentary Affairs
Party Politics
Perspectives on Political Science
Perspectives on Politics
Philosophy & Public Affairs
Policy & Internet
Policy Studies Journal
Political Analysis
Political Behavior
Political Communication
Political Geography
Political Psychology
The Political Quarterly
Political Research Quarterly
Political Science
Political Science Quarterly
Political Studies Review
Politics (academic journal)
Politics & Gender
Politics & Society
Political Theory
Presidential Studies Quarterly
PS: Political Science & Politics
Public Administration
Public Choice
Public Opinion Quarterly
Publius

Q 
Quarterly Journal of Political Science

R 
Radical Philosophy Review
Regulation & Governance
Res Publica
Review of International Organizations
Review of International Political Economy
Review of International Studies
Review of Policy Research
Review of Politics

S 
Scandinavian Political Studies
Security Dialogue
Security Studies
Social Philosophy Today
Social Science Quarterly
Social Theory and Practice
Socio-Economic Review
South European Society and Politics
Studies in American Political Development
Survival
Swiss Political Science Review

T 
 Teorija in praksa
Terrorism and Political Violence

W 
 West European Politics
 World Politics

Y 
Yale Journal of International Affairs

Further reading
 
 
  Pdf.
  Pdf.
 
  View online.
This listing of 118 journals in political science identifies the journals' field(s) of specialization, requirements for submitting manuscripts, procedures for reviewing manuscripts, and rates of manuscript submission and acceptance. Includes details on journal web sites and electronic submission information.

Political science